The Military Gallery is a gallery of the Winter Palace in Saint Petersburg, Russia. The gallery is a setting for 332 portraits of generals who took part in the Patriotic War of 1812. The portraits were painted by George Dawe and his Russian assistants Alexander Polyakov (1801–1835), a serf, and Wilhelm August Golicke.

The top-lit, barrel-vaulted hall in which the gallery is accommodated was designed by architect Carlo Rossi and constructed from June to November 1826. It replaced several small rooms in the middle of the main block of the Winter Palace - between the White Throne Hall and the Greater Throne Hall, just a few steps from the palace church. The gallery was opened in a solemn ceremony on 25 December 1826.

Less than ten years after its completion, it was destroyed by fire in 1837. The fire burned slowly and Dawe's portraits were saved from the flames. The architect Vasily Stasov recreated the hall exactly as it had been before.

He describes the experience as an eerie one, standing under the rows of portraits in the "huge hall" lit only by a single bulb over a cluster of banners. The isolation of the solitary sentry was emphasized by the two to three minutes that footsteps could be heard down halls and corridors before the replacement guard arrived in the gallery.
    
During the Soviet era, the gallery collection was enhanced by four portraits of Palace Grenadiers, the special ceremonial unit created in 1827 from veterans of the Patriotic War of 1812 to guard the entire building. The portraits were also painted by George Dawe, in 1828. More recently, the gallery acquired two paintings by Peter von Hess from the 1840s.

Today, as part of the Hermitage Museum, this room retains its original decoration.

See also
 List of Russian commanders in the Patriotic War of 1812

References

External links
 
  Hermitage Museum Website
  www.museum.ru

Napoleonic Wars
Hermitage Museum
Carlo Rossi buildings and structures
1826 establishments in the Russian Empire